The 1979–80 Iona Gaels men's basketball team represented Iona College during the 1979–80 NCAA Division I men's basketball season. The Gaels, led by fifth-year head coach Jim Valvano, played their home games at the Hynes Athletic Center. The Gaels won the ECAC Metro Basketball tournament to receive a bid to the 1980 NCAA tournament. As the No. 6 seed in the East region, the Gaels defeated No. 11 seed  in the opening round – the first and only NCAA Tournament victory in school history. Iona was narrowly defeated by No. 3 seed Georgetown in the round of 32. As of the 2020–21 NCAA Division I men's basketball season, this is the furthest any Iona men's team has ever advanced in the NCAA Tournament.

On February 21, Iona halted No. 2 Louisville’s 18-game winning streak by dominating the Cardinals, 77–60, at Madison Square Garden. It was the last game Louisville would lose during the season en route to winning the 1980 NCAA Championship. It was the 12th straight of what would end up being a 17-game win streak for the Gaels.

Roster

Schedule and results

|-
!colspan=9 style=| Regular season

|-
!colspan=9 style=| ECAC Metro tournament

|-
!colspan=9 style=| NCAA tournament

Rankings

Awards and honors
Jeff Ruland – All-American, Haggerty Award, Great Alaska Shootout Tournament MVP

NBA draft

References

Iona Gaels men's basketball seasons
Iona
Iona